Chab is the stage name used by Swiss trance music producer and remixer François Chabloz.  Known for his progressive trance style, Chabloz has an extensive history as a remixer and he has also released original material under the monikers Moogwai and Star.  Artists remixed by Chab include Gorillaz, Depeche Mode, Röyksopp, Ayumi Hamasaki, Nelly Furtado, and Every Little Thing.

The work of Chab has been noticed by electronic DJ Paul Oakenfold and subsequently used on a trance compilation album of the same. In 2001, electronic music producer and DJ Tiësto featured Chab's work as well.

Discography

1999 "Running Up That Hill" (with Frank Gee)
1999, 6/26 "A Night out" (Moogwai)
2000 "Tunneling" / "The Sinus" (as Chab)
2000 "Rock Rose" (as Star)
2001 "Viola" (as Moogwai) - UK #55
2001 "The Labyrinth" (as Moogwai) - UK #68
2005 "5 Wishes & More" (as Moogwai)
2005 "Dub, Edits and Whisky-Coke" (as Chab)

See also
Revolution (Tiësto album)

References

External links
Official website

Remixers
Swiss trance musicians
Living people
Year of birth missing (living people)
Swiss house musicians